Coeloglutus is a genus of flies in the family Dolichopodidae. It is known from Guatemala, Ecuador, El Salvador, the Lesser Antilles (Dominica and St. Vincent), Puerto Rico, Costa Rica, Venezuela, Bolivia, Panama and Peru, and contains only one species, Coeloglutus concavus.

References

Dolichopodidae genera
Neurigoninae
Diptera of North America
Diptera of South America
Monotypic Diptera genera
Taxa named by John Merton Aldrich